Richard Twining may refer to:
 Richard Twining (tea merchant, born 1749) (1749–1824), English merchant, director of the East India Company, and the head of Twinings
 Richard Twining (tea merchant, born 1772) (1772–1857), his son, English merchant, director of the East India Company, and the head of Twinings
 Richard Twining (cricketer),  English cricketer